Spitfire Over Berlin is a 2022 British war film focusing on an aerial spying mission during World War II. Like Burn's prior film, Lancaster Skies, it is a homage to the British war films of the 1940s and 1950s, and is inspired by true events.

Plot
Daredevil pilot Edward Barnes is recruited for a special mission: Operation Extreme Jeopardy, taking an unarmed observation plane over Berlin to photograph defence installations and prevent an American squadron from heading to certain death.

Cast
Kris Saddler as Flight Lieutenant Edward Barnes
David Dobson as Group Captain
Tom Gordon as David
Vin Hawke as Stanley
Jeffrey Mundell as B-17 Pilot

Production
The film was inspired by the RAF Photo Reconnaissance Unit, who provided photographic intelligence for the Allied Forces during World War II. The film was shot in Lincolnshire.

Reception
Phil Hoard of The Guardian gave the film two out of five stars, writing, Spitfire Over Berlin’s ambition is laudable, and the flight sequences are precise and technically accomplished for a DIY production. But it needs to take a good hard look under the hood.' The Times also gave it two out of five stars, commending the Burns' efforts with limited resources, but stating, 'The results, alas, in actual film-making terms, are punishingly poor and amount to little more than 80 minutes of bad acting inside a cardboard cockpit'.

References

External links

2020s war films
British World War II films
British aviation films
British war epic films
World War II aviation films
Films set in England
Films set in Germany
2020s English-language films
2020s British films